The Rabbi is a river in the Tuscany and Emilia-Romagna regions of Italy. The source of the river is in the Foreste Casentinesi, Monte Falterona, Campigna National Park in the Appennino Tosco-Emiliano mountains in the province of Florence. The river crosses the border into the province of Forlì-Cesena and flows northeast near Premilcuore and Predappio before joining the Montone near Forlì.

References

Rivers of the Province of Florence
Rivers of the Province of Forlì-Cesena
Rivers of the Apennines
Rivers of Italy